Maksim Sergeyevich Boychuk (born 17 November 1997) is a Russian football player.

Club career
He made his debut in the Russian Football National League for PFC Spartak Nalchik on 12 March 2017 in a game against FC Baltika Kaliningrad.

References

External links
 Profile by Russian Football National League
 

1997 births
People from Borovsky District
Living people
Russian footballers
Association football forwards
PFC Spartak Nalchik players
Nike Academy players
FC Znamya Truda Orekhovo-Zuyevo players
FC Akron Tolyatti players
Sportspeople from Kaluga Oblast